David Goodman may refer to:

 David Goodman (athlete) (born 1958), Australian Paralympian
 David Goodman (Medal of Honor) (1846–?), private in the U.S. Army
 David Goodman (politician) (born 1967), member of the Ohio Senate
 Dave Goodman (record producer) (1951–2005), English musician and early sound engineer/record producer for the Sex Pistols
 David A. Goodman (born 1962), American writer and producer
 David G. Goodman (1946–2011), American Japanologist
 David H. Goodman (fl. 1997), American television writer and producer
 David Goodman (chess player) (born 1958), British international master chess player
 David S. G. Goodman (born 1948), Australian academic
 David Zelag Goodman (1930–2011), film and television writer

See also
 David Goodman Mandelbaum (1911–1987), American anthropologist
 David Goodman Croly (1829–1889), American journalist